Castle Freeman     Jr. (born Nov 26, 1944) is the award-winning author of the acclaimed novel Go With Me, adapted into the film Blackway (2015) starring  Anthony Hopkins and Julia Stiles. For 30 years he was a contributor to The Old Farmer's Almanac and is the author of four other novels, two short-story collections, as well as a major history of a Vermont township.

Life
Castle Freeman Jr. was born in San Antonio, Texas in 1944, the son of an officer in the Army Air Corps. His family was from Illinois, though, and he grew up in Chicago. He studied at Columbia University School of General Studies graduating in 1968, and in 1969 married artist and designer Alice Chaffee. In 1972, they moved to Vermont, living in Newfane since 1975.

Writing
Freeman began writing on his arrival in Vermont. Although employed as an editor and proof-reader for book and magazine publishers, he has been a regular contributor to several periodicals including The Old Farmer's Almanac (1982-2011), Harrowsmith Country Life Magazine (1992-93), and Vermont Life Magazine (2009–2018). He has had four novels and two short-story collections published as well as a collection of essays and a history of Townshend, Vermont. He is also the author of fifty short-stories and over 100 essays and other non-fiction. Virtually all his writing concerns rural northern New England and Vermont in particular

His work has also appeared in The Best American Short Stories and The Best American Nonrequired Reading.

His first novel Judgement Hill published in 1997 was according to Publishers Weekly, "an intricate first novel", " While the dialogue, rich in vernacular and quiet humor, is sometimes difficult to follow, Freeman uses it cleverly to reveal the complex motivations of his not-so-homespun characters...this occasionally overwritten fable brims with local color that conveys Freeman's deep feeling for the Vermont environment". Publishers Weekly were also positive about his next novel, My Life and Adventures, finishing their comments with "Although the book's momentum is sometimes hampered by flaccid historical tidbits, Freeman's witty and thoughtful observations are bound to charm" It was Castle Freeman's third novel Go With Me which found most acclaim, was republished in paperback by HarperCollins and received wide praise on both sides of the Atlantic. His novel All That I Have was praised by The Times: "It is impossible not to appreciate this spare, meditative and seamlessly crafted novel."

Bibliography
Castle Freeman's published work includes:

Novels
Judgment Hill (1997)
My Life and Adventures (2002)
Go With Me (2008)
All That I Have (2009)
The Devil in the Valley (2015)
Old Number Five (2018)
Children of the Valley (2020)

Short story collections
The Bride of Ambrose and Other Stories (1987)
Round Mountain: Twelve Stories (2012)

Others
Spring Snow: The Seasons of New England from The Old Farmer's Almanac (1995) - Essay collection
A Stitch In Time : Townshend, Vermont, 1753-2003 (non-fiction)

References

External links

Castle Freeman Jr. interview
Monday Interview: Castle Freeman Jr.
"The Next Thing on Benefit" Online short-story from the New England Review

Living people
1944 births
Writers from San Antonio
People from Newfane, Vermont
Novelists from Vermont
Writers from Chicago
Columbia University School of General Studies alumni
American male short story writers
American male novelists
Novelists from Texas
Novelists from Illinois
American male non-fiction writers
20th-century American male writers
20th-century American novelists
20th-century American short story writers
20th-century American non-fiction writers
21st-century American male writers
21st-century American novelists
21st-century American short story writers
21st-century American non-fiction writers